Brenda Brave Helps Grandmother (original title: Kajsa Kavat) is a 1950 story by Astrid Lindgren about a young girl named Brenda (Kajsa) in Sweden. The book about the character has been translated into many different languages.

Plot 
As a baby, Brenda is put onto the doorstep of a woman, that she later calls grandmother. Her grandmother takes care of her until she breaks her leg. Then Brenda suddenly is the one to take care of her grandmother. She goes to the market and sells the bonbons that her grandmother made and cleans the house. As Brenda has helped out so well, she gets the doll for Christmas that she had always wished for.

Background 
The story was first published in 1949 in the Swedish magazine Vi, illustrated by Ingrid Vang Nyman. In 1950 it was included in a novel collection called Kajsa Kavat. Later it was published as a picture book on its own, illustrated by Ilon Wikland. It was translated into many languages, among them English and German. While the Swedish name of the girl is Kasja Kavat, she has a different name in other countries: Brenda Brave (English), Greta Grintosa (Italian) and Polly Patent (German). 

In Germany the book was also edited into a theatre play, which was shown in the theatre of Gütersloh. One of the attractions of Astrid Lindgren's World also deals with Brenda Brave and her story.

Film 

In 1989 there was a short film called Brenda Brave was made, which tells Brenda's story. It was directed by Daniel Bergman.

See also
 List of Christmas-themed literature

References

External links
 

Astrid Lindgren characters
Novel series
Series of children's books
Swedish children's literature
Fictional Swedish people
1950 children's books
Christmas children's books
Novels about orphans
Fictional orphans
Female characters in literature
Orphan characters in literature